Madea's Witness Protection is a 2012 American comedy film directed, written and produced by Tyler Perry. The film stars Perry, Eugene Levy, Denise Richards, Doris Roberts, Romeo Miller, Tom Arnold, John Amos, and Marla Gibbs. It is the fourteenth film by Perry and the seventh installment in the Madea cinematic universe. It is the fourth Perry film not to be adapted from a play, alongside The Family That Preys, Daddy's Little Girls, and Good Deeds, as well as the first Madea film not to be adapted from a play. It tells the story about Madea being a host to a family that the FBI has entered into the witness protection program due to the fact that the patriarch has been the CFO of a company that a crime family was using to further their Ponzi schemes.

The film was filmed in Atlanta from mid to late January to the beginning of March 2012 and was released through 34th Street Films and Lionsgate. With total box office gross of about $67 million, Madea's Witness Protection is in the top three of Tyler Perry's most successful movies, after Boo! A Madea Halloween and Madea Goes to Jail.

Plot
George Needleman (Eugene Levy) is a nerdy, high level CFO in New York City who lives with his second wife Kate (Denise Richards), his mother Barbara (Doris Roberts), his troubled youth daughter Cindy (Danielle Campbell) from an earlier marriage, and his son Howie (Devan Leos) in nearby suburban Connecticut. He promises Howie that he will take him to his Saturday afternoon baseball game after he gets back from the office. He gets to his office at Lockwise Industries and arrives to a harrowing scene; his co-workers are shredding documents and are in a state of chaos. He sees his boss Walter (Tom Arnold) who informs him that his company is a Ponzi scheme run by the Malone crime family. Walter pins the blame on George for spearheading the scheme and laundering funds before sneaking out.

Meanwhile at Atlanta's District Attorney Office, Brian Simmons (Tyler Perry) and his boss Lucas (Jeff Joslin) have researched the Malone crime family's activities. With Walter having taken a private jet to Europe with a chance that he'll fight extradition, their best bet is to get George to testify against the Malone crime family. The FBI picks up George's family and places into a witness protection program. The program has Brian relocating them to a refuge where the Malone crime family's will not think to look for them: Madea and Joe's house in Georgia.

Meanwhile, Jake Nelson (Romeo Miller)whose elderly, failing father (John Amos) is a church pastor who has put him in charge of the church's mortgage fundstages a robbery against Madea (Tyler Perry) which is unsuccessful. Jake, who has a criminal past but whose father trusts that he has turned over a new leaf, is trying to recover church funds that he has invested in Lockwise Industries without his father's knowledge or consent only to lose the entire investment in the Ponzi scheme.

The Needlemans' first meeting with Madea and Joe (Tyler Perry) is awkward and bodes poorly for how everyone will get along as Madea coves up their appearance at her house to her neighbor Hattie (Marla Gibbs). Over time, Madea helps Kate and Cindy relate better to each other and to other family members, while Joe and Kate help George become more confident, more in touch with his surroundings and people around him, and more effective in channeling his emotions. Barbara displays dual sensibilities about "colored people". On one hand, she mistakes Madea for a domestic named Sadie, treats "Sadie" imperiously, and threatens to get her fired. On the other hand, she recognizes Joe as a man she slept with years ago (and George's biological father), and relates to him seductively. She also enjoys Negro spirituals and repeatedly asks to be taken to the African American church down the street from Madea's house.

Pastor Nelson's sermon inspires George to recognize a pattern in his company's records that explains where 10% of the stolen funds have been stashed. After church, watching Whoopi Goldberg's Oda Mae Brown character in Ghost inspires George to involve Madea in a plan to re-divert funds from the "stashed" accounts back to the 12 charities whose investments were stolen in the Ponzi scheme.

The plan requires George (who disguises himself as a Frenchman to avoid detection by the Malone mob), Jake, and Madea (who assumes the identity of an upscale woman named "Precious Jackson") to travel to New York City, and for "Precious" to meet with bank manager Jack Goldenberg (Frank Brennan) to transfer funds from the laundered accounts to the 12 legitimate charities. When George and Jake begin to share their plan with Brian, he cuts them off and advises them it's illegal.

When the three of them are in New York, Madea successfully accomplishes her mission. Although she improvises both an expansion of her assumed identity (by pretending to be the oldest Jackson sister) and also has some of the money sent to her real bank account which she passes off as a 13th charity.

After the caper, Brian informs George that his cooperation with the authorities and his successful efforts to return the "13" charities' funds have given Brian leverage to dismiss the charges against George as well as Walter and the rest of George's bosses being pressured to testify against the Malone crime family.

Kate points out to George that the situation has strengthened their relationship and their family, and that it is a blessing in disguise. Upon leaving Madea's house, Cindy and Howie ask if they can come back to visit. Both Madea and Joe immediately decline, though Madea does so in a sweet demeanor.

Before returning to New York, the Needlemans visit Pastor Nelson's church one last time. Pastor Nelson and Jake burn the mortgage papers and the entire congregation celebrates the mortgage's being paid off and the Needlemans enjoy the Negro spirituals. Madea also enjoys the spiritual music from her front porch while celebrating her new wealth.

Cast
 Tyler Perry as:
 Mabel "Madea" Simmons, a tough elderly lady.
 Brian Simmons, the nephew of Madea who works as a lawyer.
 Joe Simmons, the brother of Madea and the father of Brian.
 Eugene Levy as George Needleman, the CFO of Lockwise Industries whose family is entered into the witness protection program by the FBI.
 Denise Richards as Kate Needleman, George's second wife, and Cindy's stepmother and George’s mother.
 Doris Roberts as Barbara Needleman, the mother of George.
 Romeo Miller as Jake Nelson, a young man who loses the church's money to Lockwise Industries.
 Tom Arnold as Walter Burns, the COO of Lockwise Industries and George's boss.
 John Amos as Pastor Nelson, a pastor who is the father of Jake.
 Marla Gibbs as Hattie, Madea's neighbor.
 Danielle Campbell as Cindy Needleman, the troubled youth daughter, and older child of George Needleman from a previous relationship and Howie's half-sister.
 Devan Leos as Howie Needleman, the son of George and Kate Needleman, George's youngest child, and Cindy's half-brother.
 Jeff Joslin as Lucas, Brian Simmons' boss who helps in investigating the activities of the Malone crime family.
 Frank Brennan as Jack Goldenberg, a bank manager in New York.
 Charlie Sheen as himself (uncredited cameo), he is seen in one of the outtakes during the credits where Madea encounters him offset.

Reception
The film received generally negative reviews. Rotten Tomatoes gives the film a score of 19% based on 37 reviews, with an average rating of 4.20/10. On Metacritic, the film has a score of 42 out of 100 based on reviews from 15 critics, indicating "mixed or average reviews". Audiences polled by CinemaScore gave the film an A− grade.

Madea's Witness Protection received five Golden Raspberry Award nominations including Worst Actress (Tyler Perry as Madea), Worst Director, Worst Screen Couple (Perry and his drag getup), Worst Screen Ensemble and Worst Prequel, Remake, Rip-off or Sequel.

Box office
The film opened with $25,390,575 in its opening weekend, ranking #4 behind Ted, Magic Mike, and Brave. As of August 2019 the film has grossed total of $66,899,242 worldwide, surpassing its $20 million budget, making it a financial success despite poor reviews.

Home media
Madea's Witness Protection was released on DVD and Blu-Ray on October 23, 2012.

References

External links
 
 
 

2012 films
2012 comedy films
American comedy films
2010s English-language films
Films directed by Tyler Perry
Films scored by Aaron Zigman
Films set in Georgia (U.S. state)
Films set in New York City
Films shot in Georgia (U.S. state)
Films shot in Atlanta
Lionsgate films
Films with screenplays by Tyler Perry
Films about witness protection
2010s American films